Yeniköy is a village in the Göle District, Ardahan Province, Turkey. Its population is 668 (2021).

References

Villages in Göle District